The 1932 NCAA Wrestling Championships were the 5th NCAA Wrestling Championships to be held. Indiana University in Bloomington, Indiana hosted the tournament at IU Fieldhouse.

Indiana took home the team championship with 14 points with one individual champion.

Edwin Belshaw of Indiana was named the Outstanding Wrestler.

Team results

Individual finals

References

NCAA Division I Wrestling Championship
Wrestling competitions in the United States
1932 in American sports
1932 in Indiana